Secret Code is the debut major album of artist Aya Kamiki, released on July 12, 2006. It comes in a CD only version. Secret Code debuted at number 5 on the Oricon Weekly Charts for Japan and sold 70756 copies in total. "Secret Code" was used as the ending theme song for JAPAN COUNTDOWN.

Track listing 
Communication Break
Pierrot (ピエロ.apk)
(もう君だけを離したりはしない) 
Secret Code
Bounce, Bounce, Bounce
Pride of Place (プライド オブ プレイス) 
Natsu no Aru Hi (夏のある日) 
I Sing This Song For You
Kizudarake Demo Dakishimete (傷だらけでも抱きしめて) 
Believe in YOU
Can't stop fallin' in LOVE
Changing The World
Friends (フレンズ)

Sales
Initial week estimate: 31,158   
Total estimate: 65,004

References
GIZA studio (2006), Aya Kamiki official website
Oricon Style (2006), Oricon profile

2006 debut albums
Aya Kamiki albums
Being Inc. albums
Giza Studio albums
Albums produced by Daiko Nagato